The 2014–15 Liga EBA season was the 21st edition of the Liga EBA. This is the fourth division of Spanish basketball. Four teams will be promoted to LEB Plata. The regular season started in October 2014 and finished in March 2015. Promotion playoffs to LEB Plata were played in April 2015.

Format

Regular season
Teams are divided in five groups by geographical criteria. Groups A and E is also divided in two. The maximum number of teams in groups A to D was reduced to fourteen. In Group E, ten teams are allowed at sub-group E-A:
Group A-A: Cantabria, Basque Country, La Rioja and Castile and León.
Group A-B: Galicia, Asturias and Castile and León.
Group B: Community of Madrid, Castile-La Mancha and Canary Islands.
Group C: Catalonia and Aragón.
Group D: Andalusia, Extremadura and Melilla.
Sub-group E-A: Valencian Community and Region of Murcia.
Sub-group E-B: Balearic Islands.

Final play-off
The three best teams of each group and the fourth of Group A (champion of the previous season) will play the promotion playoffs. From these 16 teams, only four will be promoted to LEB Plata. The winner of each group can organize a group stage.

The final promotion playoffs will be played round-robin format in groups of four teams where the first qualified of each group will host one of the stages.

Regular season

Group A-A

Group A-B

Group B

Group C

Group D

Group E

Sub-group E-A

Sub-group E-B
The sub-group E-B, also called EBA Baleares was created as a merge of the Balearic groups of EBA and Primera División. CB Andraitx Giwine and CCE Sant Lluís only played the first half as they qualify to the second stage with the four best teams of the sub-group E-A.

Second stage (Group E)

Relegation group (Group E)
Games played between teams of this group in the first round are included.

Promotion playoffs
The 16 qualified teams will be divided in four groups of four teams. The first qualified teams will host the groups, played with a round-robin format. They will be played from 22 to 24 May 2015.

The winner of each group will promote to LEB Plata.

Group 1 – Coín
CB Deportivo Coín will organize this group due to the resignation of Real Madrid B to organize it.

Group 2 – Albacete
Albacete Basket will organize this group due to the resignation of Aracena AEC Collblanc to organize it.

Group 3 – Morón de la Frontera

Group 4 – Andratx

References

External links
Liga EBA at FEB.es

Liga EBA seasons
EBA